Ophir Optronics Solutions is a multinational company that sells optronics solutions. The company develops, manufactures and markets infrared (IR) optics and laser measurement equipment.
Founded in 1976, the company was traded on the Tel Aviv Stock Exchange from 1991 until it was acquired, and was a constituent of its Tel-tech index. 
Headquartered in the Har Hotzvim industrial park in Jerusalem, Israel Ophir owns a  complex that includes the group's main production plant. Ophir has additional production plants in North Andover, Massachusetts and Logan, Utah in the US and sales offices in the US, Japan and Europe.
In 2006, Ophir acquired Spiricon Group, a US-based company in the beam-profiling market. Ophir's sales increased sharply from $45 million in 2005 to $74 million in 2007.
During 2007, Ophir established a Swiss-based subsidiary (Ophir Optics Europe GmbH) to market lenses and components for surveillance and imaging systems in Europe. In May 2010, Ophir acquired Photon Inc., another US-based beam-profiling company.  Newport Corporation, a global supplier in photonics solutions, completed its acquisition of the Ophir company in October 2011. In 2016, metrology firm MKS Instruments bought Newport Corporation, including the Ophir brand, for $980 million.

In 2017, Ophir Optronics, Ophir Optics Group, released the LightIR range of infrared thermal imaging zoom lenses, designed for UAVs, drones, and handheld devices. At Eurosatory 2018, Ophir introduced another infrared thermal imaging lens to the range, the LightIR 15-75mm f/1.2, for uncooled 10–12-µm-pixel-size long–wave infrared (LWIR) detectors. In 2019, Ophir expanded its family of cooled MWIR long range lenses, adding 900mm and 1350mm FLs, for use in aviation and observation systems.

In January 2020, Ophir's SupIR 50-1350mm f/5.5, an MWIR long range lens for thermal imaging cameras, was named a 2020 SPIE's PRISM Awards finalist in the category of Safety and Security.

Ophir Groups and Subsidiaries 
Ophir Photonics Group 
The Ophir Photonics Group manufactures, calibrates and sells a complete line of laser measurement  instruments for analyzing and measuring laser power, energy, beam profile and spectrum used in industry, telecom, medical and scientific research. Products include reliable and accurate laser power and energy meters, laser beam diagnostic instrumentation, laser measurement tools and spectral analysis instruments, which comply with NIST calibration.

Infrared Optics Group
The Infrared Optics Group designs and produces optical lenses and elements for military, security and commercial markets. All manufacturing is done in-house, using automated CNC and patented Diamond Turning technologies. 

3-D Non-Contact Measurement Group (Optimet)
Optical Metrology Ltd., an Ophir subsidiary, has developed new non-contact 3-dimensional measurement systems using its patented conoscopic holography technology. Optimet sensors provide precise 3-D measurements for applications in the motor, dentistry, electronics, steelworks, mechanics and aviation, quality control, in-process inspection and reverse engineering industries.

In July 2008, the FIMI fund invested $23.5 million in Ophir in exchange for five million
shares of the company and 1.75 million warrants, exercisable within five years at $5.75 each.

In December 2016 Haaretz reported that Ophir Optronics was subject of British intelligence gathering, as it was believed connected to Israeli defense fiber optics systems.

References 
Ophir Optronics: Company Profile

External links 
 Official website: www.ophiropt.com
 Ophir's blog
 Ophir's newsletter
Ophir optics linkedin 

Medical technology companies of Israel
Optics manufacturing companies